Ah Boys to Men is a Singaporean satirical military comedy film series that began in 2012 with the film Ah Boys to Men. 
Presented By J Team Production Mm2 Entertainment, produced by Jack Neo, Lim Teck and Leonard Lai. Jack Neo directed all four films. The movie has received a popular cult-following in recent years, in spite of low critic reviews.

Development
Ah Boys to Men is Jack Neo's first military-themed film, as well as his "most ambitious project so far" according to himself. Neo had wanted to shoot a military-themed film since his recruit days after being influenced by Taiwanese army films, but could not find the right opportunity. Neo was originally approached by the Ministry of Defence (MINDEF) to edit footages from the 2010 documentary Every Singaporean Son into a film. After much deliberation, Neo decided to not use the footages and instead write a brand new script. The production received the full support from MINDEF to shoot the film; they were provided access to vehicles, equipment and weapons as well as on-site consultants. Neo did not accept financial funding from MINDEF as he wanted to retain full control of the creative process. The film was funded under the Media Development Authority’s Production Assistance grant, and by investors and sponsors, some of which included Toast Box, Bee Cheng Hiang and KPMG.

Research for the film alone took around two and a half months. Neo said the decision to break the film into two parts was made after the distributors told him to keep the films 100 minutes in length, as any longer and it would have been more expensive and difficult to schedule. With a budget of S$3 million, Ah Boys to Men is Singapore's most expensive film.

Films

Main series

Ah Boys to Men (2012)

The main plot revolves around a group of army recruits in National Service in Singapore. Neo had wanted to shoot an army-themed film since his army days, but could not find a suitable chance to do so.

Ah Boys to Men 2 (2013)

Ah Boys to Men 2 focuses more on the unity of the protagonists, as well as tapping more on hot social topics like foreign talent in Singapore. It gave "a stronger story than its predecessor", and had a "more meaty" drama aspect, according to Jack Neo. Other themes for the sequel include "sacrifice, love, family and patriotism".

Ah Boys to Men 3: Frogmen (2015)

The film negates all happenings in the predecessors and explores what might have happened should the boys have been assigned to the Naval Diving Unit.

Ah Boys to Men 4 (2017)

The film focuses on the main characters who have to juggle between their work and their reservist duties.

Spin-off

Ah Girls Go Army (2022)

The film follows the first batch of female recruits as they undergo and serve National Service in the near future of Singapore.

Cast

Ah Boys to Men (2012)

Ah Boys to Men 2 (2013)

Ah Boys to Men 3: Frogmen (2015)

Ah Boys to Men 4 (2017)

Ah Girls Go Army (2022)

Crew
Ah Boys to Men was directed by Jack Neo and the script was written by Neo and Link Sng. Neo, Lim Teck, and Leonard Lai served as producers, while Neo's wife Irene Kng, along with Mang, Teck, Tengku Iesta, Tengku Alaudin, Kenny Chua, William Sin, Dominic Inn, Tan Tong Hai, Eric Liang and Sky Li Yunfei, served as executive producers.

See also
 List of Singaporean films of 2012
 List of Singaporean films of 2013
 List of Singaporean films of 2015
 Army Daze

References

Film series introduced in 2012
Films directed by Jack Neo
Films set in Singapore
Films shot in Singapore
Singaporean comedy films
Tetralogies